Daddy (translit. Papa) is a 2004 Russian drama film directed by and starring Vladimir Mashkov. It was entered into the 26th Moscow International Film Festival.

Plot
Abraham Schwartz, a bookkeeper living in a small town in Ukraine, makes everything possible to educate his son as a violinist and to send him to Moscow where the latter is educated, earns popularity and finds his love. But when the father comes to Moscow to see his son, the latter feels embarrassed of his "improper" origin, "ugly" look and behaviour. Soon a war erupts, and the home town is taken by Germans while the son serves in the army.

Cast
 Vladimir Mashkov as Abraham Schwartz
 Egor Beroev as David
 Andrei Rozendent as David Schwartz, 12 Years
 Olga Krasko as Tanya
 Lidiya Pakhomova as Tanya, 12 Years 
 Olga Miroshnikova as Hannah
 Kseniya Barkalova as Hannah, 12 Years
 Sergey Dreyden as Meyer Wolf
 Kseniya Lavrova-Glinka as Lyudmila Shutova (as Kseniya Glinka)
 Anatoly Vasilyev as Ivan Kuzmich Chernyshov 
 Andrey Smolyakov as Odintsov

References

External links
 

2004 films
2004 drama films
2000s Russian-language films
Russian drama films
Holocaust films